Natalie Galea (born 2 July 1973) is an Australian judoka. She competed in the women's half-heavyweight event at the 1996 Summer Olympics.

References

1973 births
Living people
Australian female judoka
Olympic judoka of Australia
Judoka at the 1996 Summer Olympics
Sportspeople from Sydney
20th-century Australian women